George Whitefield Davis (July 26, 1839 – July 12, 1918) was an engineer and major general in the United States Army. He also served as a military governor of Puerto Rico and as the first military Governor of the Panama Canal Zone.

Military career

Civil War
Davis was born in the rural town of Thompson, Connecticut. He first entered the Army during the American Civil War, joining the 11th Connecticut Infantry Regiment in November 1861 as a Company Quartermaster Sergeant (the same position that his grandfather served in during the American Revolution). During the course of the war, he fought in several major battles, including Antietam, and worked his way up in rank in the volunteer force to the rank of major. He was mustered out in April 1866.

After the war
In January 1867, Davis joined the 14th Infantry Regiment. As a captain, Davis was an assistant engineer on the construction project to build the Washington Monument, and was among the featured guests at the dedication ceremony in 1885.

Afterwards, Davis became vice-president of the construction company that was to build the Nicaragua Canal and chairman of the international board of consulting engineers on the Panama Canal. In 1895, he filled on opening on the Antietam Battlefield Board that helped oversee the preservation and monumentation of that historic place, culminating in the establishment of the Antietam National Battlefield.

With the outbreak of the Spanish–American War, Davis was promoted to lieutenant colonel of regulars and brigadier general of Volunteers. During the period of May 1898 until March 1899, he commanded the 2nd Division of the Second Army Corps at Camp Alger and Thoroughfare Gap, Virginia; Camp Meade, Pennsylvania; and Camp Fornance in South Carolina.

In 1899 he was elected as a Veteran Companion of the Pennsylvania Commander of the Military Order of Foreign Wars.
He then served as United States Governor of Puerto Rico and later as United States Governor of the Panama Canal Zone. 

He was promoted to major general in July 1902, and retired on his 64th birthday in 1903.

Davis was a chairman of the central committee of the American Red Cross from 1907 to 1915. He died on July 12, 1918 in Washington, D.C.

References

External links
 
 Mellander, Gustavo A., Mellander, Nelly, Charles Edward Magoon: The Panama Years. Río Piedras, Puerto Rico: Editorial Plaza Mayor. ISBN 1-56328-155-4. OCLC 42970390. (1999)
 Mellander, Gustavo A., The United States in Panamanian Politics: The Intriguing Formative Years." Danville, Ill.: Interstate Publishers. OCLC 138568. (1971)

1839 births
1918 deaths
People from Thompson, Connecticut
Governors of Puerto Rico
Governors of the Panama Canal Zone
American engineers
American Red Cross personnel
Burials at Arlington National Cemetery
People of Connecticut in the American Civil War
United States Army generals
United States military governors
Military personnel from Connecticut
Engineers from Connecticut